The guru peetha was established as a spiritual and cultural center for Kuruba Gowdas in the state of Karnataka, India. The Mahasamsthana has been presided over by Shri Beerendra Keshava Tarakananda Puri Swamiji  for thirteen years. He wanted to start schools for children of the rural Halumatha community in Kaginele and beyond.
 
In 2005, Shri Beerendra swamiji had organized a function, which was attended by a large number of people from all over Karnataka and he shared his vision to develop Kaginele as a Maha Samstana.

Under Shri Beerendra swamiji there were four swamijis:

1.Shri Niranjanananda puri Swamiji, Kaginele, Matha Haveri District, Belludi Matha, Davanagere District

2.Shri Siddaramananda Swamiji, Tinthani Bridge Matha, Devadurga Talluka, RAICHUR District, Karnataka

3.Shri Eshwarananda Puri Swamiji, Hosadurga Matha, Chitradurga District

4.Shri Shivanananda Puri Swamiji, Mysore Matha Mysore District

After Shri Beerendra swamiji attained moksha, Shri Niranjanananda puri Swamiji took over as president on rotational basis (for five years) to Kanaka Guru Peeta. He has further developed Kaginel mutt by providing  Various facilities. Also, Neeranjanda swamiji has built Belludi Kaginele shakha mutt in Harihar taluka, Davanagere district to help poor people from Harihar and around.

Sri Siddaramananda swamiji running primary to degree colleges. And also celebrate halumatha samskruti vybhava every year on January 12,13,14th. Many books were published under Siddaramananda swamiji to aware halumatha culture. Original drums (wooden and leather) are manufactured in tinthani math. 
Under Siddaramananda swamiji four branches are running in Koppala, Kustagi, Basava Kalyana and Hosakote taluks.

Organisations based in Karnataka
Organizations established in 2005
2005 establishments in Karnataka